The 2019 WAC women's basketball tournament was a postseason tournament was held March 13–16, 2019, at the Orleans Arena in Paradise, Nevada. New Mexico State won the conference tournament championship game over Texas–Rio Grande Valley, in double-overtime, 76–73 to earn an automatic trip to the NCAA women's tournament.

Seeds
The teams were seeded based on record, with California Baptist not eligible to play due to the transition rules.

Schedule

Bracket

References

2018–19 Western Athletic Conference women's basketball season
WAC women's basketball tournament
WAC women's basketball tournament